Laane is a village in Kambja Parish, Tartu County, Estonia. It has a population of 155 (as of 31 December 2011). 
Ropka railway station on the Tartu–Valga railway is located on the border of Laane and Külitse villages.

References

Villages in Tartu County